Västra skogen is a station on the Blue Line of the Stockholm metro, in Huvudsta, Solna Municipality. The station was opened on 31 August 1975 as part the first stretch of the Blue Line between T-Centralen and Hjulsta. The trains were running via Hallonbergen and Rinkeby. On 18 August 1985 the extension to Rinkeby was opened, and the stretch between Hallonbergen and Rinkeby was closed for passenger traffic. It features one of the longest escalators in western Europe, 66 meters and with a vertical rise of 33 meters. This part of Huvudsta was earlier called Ingentingskogen (The Nothing Forest) after a small farm called Ingenting; the name Ingenting (Nothing) was suggested as a name for the new station, but rejected.

The station has three platforms, one for trains towards Hjulsta and Akalla, and two platforms towards Kungsträdgården, to allow trains from the two branches of the line to wait in the station before the two lines merge beyond the station.

Gallery

References

External links
Images of Västra skogen

Blue line (Stockholm metro) stations
Railway stations opened in 1975